St John, Bigrigg is an Anglican church near Bigrigg, in Cumbria in northern England. It is in the deanery of Calder, and the diocese of Carlisle. Its benefice is Egremont. The church is a grade 2 listed building.

References 

Church of England church buildings in Cumbria
Diocese of Carlisle